There are over 20,000 Grade II* listed buildings in England. This page is a list of these buildings in the district of North Devon in Devon.

North Devon

|}

Notes

External links

North Devon